The 2014 Corpus Christi mayoral election was held on November 4, 2014 to elect the mayor of Corpus Christi, Texas. It saw the reelection of Nelda Martinez.

Results

References 

Corpus Christi
Corpus Christi
Mayoral elections in Corpus Christi, Texas
Non-partisan elections